Angus Munro McIntosh (1 July 1884 – 1945) was an English professional footballer who played as an inside forward for Sunderland, Bury and Aberdeen.

References

1884 births
1945 deaths
People from Birkenhead
English footballers
Association football inside forwards
Inverness Thistle F.C. players
Sunderland A.F.C. players
Bury F.C. players
Aberdeen F.C. players
Buckie Thistle F.C. players
English Football League players
Anglo-Scots
Scottish Football League players
Footballers from Merseyside
Footballers from Inverness
Highland Football League players